Miadanasuchus is an extinct genus of peirosaurid which existed in the Maevarano Formation of Madagascar during the late Cretaceous period (Campanian age). It was first named by Erin L. Rasmusson Simons and Gregory A. Buckley in 2009 and the type species is Trematochampsa oblita. Its teeth were irregularly spaced and variable in height.

References

Prehistoric pseudosuchian genera
Late Cretaceous crocodylomorphs
Maevarano fauna
Crocodylomorphs of Madagascar
Fossil taxa described in 2009
Maastrichtian life